Craig Lee Symonds (born 31 December 1946, in Long Beach, California) was the Distinguished Visiting Ernest J. King Professor of Maritime History for the academic years 2017–2020 at the U.S. Naval War College in Newport, Rhode Island.  He is also Professor Emeritus at the U. S. Naval Academy, where he served as chairman of the history department. He is a distinguished historian of the American Civil War and maritime history. His book Lincoln and His Admirals received the Lincoln Prize.  His book Neptune: The Allied Invasion of Europe and the D-Day Landings was the 2015 recipient of the Samuel Eliot Morison Award for Naval Literature.

Early life and education
The son of Lee and Virginia Symonds, Craig Symonds attended Anaheim High School then University of California, Los Angeles, where he earned his Bachelor of Arts degree in 1967. Going on to graduate work, he obtained his M.A. in history at the University of Florida in 1969 with a thesis on "The defense of the southwestern frontier, 1784–1794: a study in governmental relations." He married Marylou Hayden on 17 January 1969 and the couple had one son. In 1971, Symonds joined the United States Naval Reserve, serving for three years until 1974 and raising to the grade of Lieutenant.  While in the Navy, he served on the staff and faculty of the Naval War College. On his release from active duty, he returned to his graduate studies in history at the University of Florida, where he obtained his Ph.D. in 1976 under the tutelage of Professor John K. Mahon with a dissertation on "Navalists and antinavalists: the naval policy debate in the United States, 1785–1827."

Academic career
In 1976, the United States Naval Academy in Annapolis, Maryland appointed Symonds assistant professor of history to succeed Professor E. B. Potter as a specialist in Naval history. He was subsequently promoted to associate professor in 1980 and professor of history in 1985. He served as chairman of the history department in 1988–1992 and appointed professor emeritus on his retirement in 2005. In 1994–1995, he was visiting lecturer at  Britannia Royal Naval College in Dartmouth, England. He returned to teach at the Naval Academy as The Class of 1957 Distinguished Professor of American Naval Heritage for 2011–12.  In 2017, he was appointed to a two-year term as the Ernest J. King Distinguished Visiting Professor of Maritime History at the U.S. Naval War College in Newport Rhode Island.

Awards
 Samuel Eliot Morison Award for Naval Literature in 2015 for Neptune: The Allied Invasion of Europe and the D-Day Landings.
 In 2014, The Naval Historical Foundation awarded him the Commodore Dudley W. Knox Naval History Lifetime Achievement Award.
 The Abraham Lincoln Book Award, 2010
 The Lincoln Prize, 2009 (co-winner with James M. McPherson) for Lincoln and His Admirals.
 The Barondess Prize, 2009
 The Daniel and Marilyn Laney Prize, 2009
 The Nevins-Freeman Prize, 2009
 The Theodore and Franklin D. Roosevelt Prize in Naval History, 2006
 Anne Arundel County Award for Literary Arts, 2006
 John Lyman Book Awards, 1995, 1999, 2009
 USNA Research Excellence Award, 1998
 USNA Teaching Excellence Award, 1988
 Navy Superior Civilian Service Award, 1994, 1998, 2005, 2020
 Navy Meritorious Civilian Service Award, 1989
 History Book Club Author, 1983, 1986, 1992, 1997, 2001, 2005, 2010
 Military Book Club Author, 1983, 1992, 1997, 2001, 2005
 Book-of-the-Month Club Author, 1983, 1986, 1992, 2001, 2005

Published works
 Charleston Blockade: The Journals of John B. Marchand, USN, edited by Craig Symonds. (Newport, RI: Naval War College Press, 1976.
 Navalists and Antinavalists: The Naval Policy Debate in the United States, 1785–1827. (University of Delaware Press, 1980).
 New Aspects of Naval History, edited by Craig Symonds. (Annapolis, MD: Naval Institute Press, 1981).
 A Battlefield Atlas of the Civil War. (Annapolis, MD: Nautical and Aviation Press, 1983). 
 
 A Battlefield Atlas of the American Revolution. (Annapolis, MD: Nautical and Aviation Press, 1986).
  (reprint 1991)
 
 Gettysburg: A Battlefield Atlas, by Craig Symonds with William J. Clipson.  (Annapolis, MD: Nautical and Aviation, 1992).
 
 Stonewall of the West: Patrick Cleburne and the Civil War. (Lawrence, KS: University Press of Kansas, 1997).
 Confederate Admiral: The Life and Wars of Franklin Buchanan. (Annapolis, MD: Naval Institute Press, 1999). 
 
 New Interpretations in Naval History: Selected Papers from the Fourteenth Naval History Symposium, Held at Annapolis, Maryland, 23–25 September 1999, Naval Institute Press (Annapolis, MD), 2001.

References

External links

 "Craig L. Symonds", Contemporary Authors Online, Gale, 2009. Farmington Hills, Mich.: Gale, 2009. 
Interview on The Battle of Midway at the Pritzker Military Museum & Library on October 7, 2011
   Marquis Who's Who Biographies On-Line
 Member of the Executive Committee of The Lincoln Forum

Living people
University of California, Los Angeles alumni
University of Florida alumni
Naval War College faculty
United States Naval Academy faculty
American naval historians
American male non-fiction writers
Historians of the United States
1946 births
Lincoln Prize winners
Historians of the American Civil War
Writers from Long Beach, California
Historians of Abraham Lincoln